Donner is an unincorporated community in Terrebonne Parish, Louisiana, United States. Its ZIP code is 70352.

Notes

Unincorporated communities in Terrebonne Parish, Louisiana
Unincorporated communities in Louisiana
Unincorporated communities in Houma – Thibodaux metropolitan area